Karuma Falls is a town in Uganda.

Location
Karuma Falls is on the Kampala–Gulu Highway, immediately south of where the highway crosses the River Nile.

Karuma Falls is the location of Karuma Power Station, the largest hydropower project in Uganda with a planned capacity of 600 megawatts. The coordinates of Karuma Falls are 2° 14' 3.00"N, 32° 14' 47.00"E (latitude: 2.234167; longitude: 32.246390).

Planning
In March 2013, Ugandan print media reported that the national government was planning a large modern city to be constructed at the site of the current town, to include the site of the proposed Karuma Power Station currently under construction.

Points of interest
The following additional points of interest are found at or near Karuma Falls:
 Kampala–Gulu Highway, crossing the river at this location.

Photos and diagrams
 Photo of Karuma Falls at Gorillatales.com

See also
Kiryandongo

References

External links
 Karuma Falls Dam Project
 Potential Hydropower Projects in Uganda

Populated places in Western Region, Uganda
Kiryandongo District
Bunyoro